Kenny de Schepper is the defending champion but lost in the first round this year.
Roberto Bautista-Agut won the title, defeating Arnau Brugués-Davi 6–3, 6–4 in the final.

Seeds

Draw

Finals

Top half

Bottom half

References
 Main draw
 Qualifying draw

Singles
2012